The list of provincial parks of Thompson-Nicola Regional District contains the provincial parks located within this regional district of the province of British Columbia. These parks are administered by BC Parks under the jurisdiction of the Ministry of Environment and Climate Change Strategy.

List of parks

External links 

Map of provincial parks in Thompson-Nicola Regional District on env.gov.bc.ca

 
Provincial parks
British Columbia, Thompson-Nicola
Provincial parks